

Harmen Siezen (born 26 December 1940) is a Dutch former journalist and presenter. From 1971 to 2002 he was a news presenter of the Dutch public news broadcaster NOS Journaal.

See also
 List of news presenters

References

External links
 

1940 births
Living people
People from Schouwen-Duiveland
Dutch television journalists
Dutch television presenters
Dutch television news presenters
Dutch radio journalists
Dutch radio presenters